Adam Rachel (born 10 December 1976) is an English former professional footballer, who currently is an academy coach  side Tamworth. During his playing career he played as a goalkeeper.

Playing career

Aston Villa
Rachel started his professional football career as a trainee with Aston Villa, turning professional in August 1996. He was mainly a reserve at Villa, making just one league appearance, against Blackburn Rovers on 26 December 1998 when he was a second-half substitute for Lee Hendrie after Villa keeper Michael Oakes had been sent off.

Blackpool
In September 1999, Rachel left Villa to join Blackpool on a free transfer. During his time with the Seasiders, he only made one appearance and was sent out on loan to Northwich Victoria in October 2000 before being released at the end of the season.

Moor Green/Solihull Moors
In July 2001 he joined Moor Green and although appearing less frequently due to increased work commitments, when Moor Green and Solihull Borough merged in the summer of 2007, Rachel joined the new Solihull Moors team.

Rachel remained at Solihull Moors until 23 November 2011, when it was announced he was to part ways with the club following 10 years' service. He had found first-team appearances very limited in the latter years due to concentrating on his coaching career.

Coaching career

Tamworth
Adam is a regular member of the academy coaching setup at Tamworth.

References

External links

1976 births
Living people
Footballers from Birmingham, West Midlands
English footballers
Association football goalkeepers
Aston Villa F.C. players
Blackpool F.C. players
Northwich Victoria F.C. players
Moor Green F.C. players
Solihull Moors F.C. players
Premier League players
English Football League players
National League (English football) players